Professional Air Traffic Controllers Organization may refer to:

 Professional Air Traffic Controllers Organization (1968) - a historical trade union representing air traffic controllers until 1981.
 Professional Air Traffic Controllers Organization (AFSCME) - a division of AFSCME
 Professional Air Traffic Controllers Organization (2003) - an independent trade union